Lab most often refers to:
 Laboratory, a facility to conduct scientific research

Lab or LAB may also refer to:

Places
 Láb, a village near Bratislava in western Slovakia
 Lab (river), in north-eastern Kosovo

People
 ISO 639 code for the ancient Minoan language of Crete

Music
 LAB Records, a British independent record label
 LAB (band), a Finnish band
 L.A.B., a New Zealand reggae band

Transportation
 Linhas Aéreas Brasileiras, a defunct Brazilian airline 
 Lloyd Aéreo Boliviano, a defunct Bolivian airline
 League of American Bicyclists

Science and technology
 Linear alkylbenzene
 Lithosphere-Asthenosphere boundary, between layers of the Earth
 Lactic acid bacteria
 Lab color space
 Lyman-alpha blob, in interstellar space
 Linear alkylbenzene sulfonate

Groups
 Langile Abertzaleen Batzordeak, a Basque trade union
 Lockerz advisory board
 Los Angeles Baptist High School, US

Other
 Labrador Retriever, a dog breed
 Legs, abs, and butt fitness workout

See also
 Labs (disambiguation)
 Labour Party (disambiguation)
 The Lab (disambiguation)